"Ramble On" is a song by English rock band Led Zeppelin from their 1969 album Led Zeppelin II. It was co-written by Jimmy Page and Robert Plant, and was recorded in 1969 at Juggy Sound Studio, New York City, during the band's second concert tour of North America. In 2010, the song was ranked number 440 on list of Rolling Stone's 500 Greatest Songs of All Time. In 2019, Rolling Stone ranked the song number 5 on its list of the 40 greatest Led Zeppelin songs. 
The song's lyrics were influenced by J. R. R. Tolkien's fantasy novel The Lord of the Rings.

Composition 

The song's lyrics, particularly in the third verse, were influenced by The Lord of the Rings by J. R. R. Tolkien, mentioning among other things the dark land of Mordor, Gollum, and The Evil One. Its first line, "Leaves are falling all around", is an adaptation of Tolkien's "Ah! like gold fall the leaves in the wind", the English translation of the first line of his Quenya (Elvish language) poem "Namárië".

Recording 

Page explained that he achieved the smooth, sustaining violin-like tone on the solo by using the neck pickup on his Les Paul with the treble cut and utilising a sustain-producing effects unit built by audio engineer Roger Mayer.

Live performances
Until 2007, "Ramble On" was never performed live in its entirety at Led Zeppelin concerts. At the Ahmet Ertegun Tribute Concert on 10 December 2007, at the O2 Arena in London; Page ended the song with a brief section of the bridge from "What Is and What Should Never Be".

Reception and charts
In a retrospective review of Led Zeppelin II (Deluxe Edition), Michael Madden of Consequence of Sound praised the remastering of "Ramble On", believing the track now sounds "mellow and well-balanced". Madden further stated the track "gets a boost from John Paul Jones' garter snake bass playing." When reviewing the added bonus tracks of the Deluxe Edition, Madden called the rough mix of "Ramble On" as the best of all the bonus tracks, finding Page's acoustic strums "particularly driving".

In 2007, "Ramble On" reached number 66 on the Canadian Billboard Hot Digital Singles Chart.

Certifications

See also
List of cover versions of Led Zeppelin songs – "Ramble On" entries

References

External links

1969 songs
Led Zeppelin songs
Music based on The Lord of the Rings
Songs written by Jimmy Page
Songs written by Robert Plant
Song recordings produced by Jimmy Page
Atlantic Records singles